Willistead Manor is a historic house located in the former town of Walkerville, Ontario, now part of Windsor, Ontario, Canada. Willistead Manor was designed by renowned architect Albert Kahn in the 16th-century Tudor-Jacobean style of an English manor house. It was built in 1904–1906, and was commissioned by Edward Chandler Walker, the second son of Hiram Walker. It is named after the first son, Willis Walker, a lawyer in Detroit, Michigan, who died young.

Contrary to popular belief, Hiram Walker never lived in the home. Edward and his wife never had any children. After Edward passed on in 1915, Mrs. Walker did not care to keep living in the big home alone, and she deeded the house and grounds to the town of Walkerville. When Walkerville was amalgamated with Windsor in 1935, it obtained ownership of Willistead.

In the years after its use as a residence, Willistead served as the Walkerville Town Hall, Art Gallery of Windsor and as a public library branch. In the late 1970s early 1980s, the City of Windsor, afraid of the repairs and upkeep on the mansion, wanted to demolish the structure. Preservationists stepped in and the home was saved. In 1976, Windsor City Council designated Willistead Manor and Park as a heritage property. 

Today the 36-room mansion is used as a banquet hall, and the fifteen-acre (62,888 m²) grounds are incorporated in a larger public park. The house can be rented for occasions such as weddings, corporate meeting and private parties. The house is also decorated for the Christmas holiday.

External links
Willistead Manor - City of Windsor, Ontario
Walkerville Times article on the history

Buildings and structures completed in 1935
Buildings and structures in Windsor, Ontario
Houses in Ontario
Albert Kahn (architect) buildings
Tudor Revival architecture in Canada
Tourist attractions in Windsor, Ontario
Estate gardens in Canada
1935 establishments in Ontario